The 2011 Yokohama F. Marinos season was Yokohama F. Marinos's 19th season in J. League Division 1 and 32nd season overall in the top flight (counting the Japan Soccer League and participation in the inaugural J. League Cup). It also includes the 2011 J. League Cup and 2011 Emperor's Cup.

Squad

As of March 7, 2011 

 (captain)

 (vice-captain)

(vice-captain)

 

(vice-captain)

(vice-captain)

(captain)

(captain)

Competitions

Pre-season friendly

J. League

League table

Matches

J. League Cup

Emperor's Cup

References

Yokohama F. Marinos
Yokohama F. Marinos seasons